Eudicella smithii is a species of African scarab beetle in the subfamily Cetoniinae, the flower beetles.

Description

The males have a Y-shaped forked horn in the forehead, typical of the entire genus and used in fighting over females and in defense of territory. The color of the pronotum can be reddish, green or blue. The elytra vary from ocher to yellowish and show a black spot on the shoulders and on the rear exterior angles. The legs are mostly reddish brown.

Due to similarities between Eudicella smithii and Eudicella euthalia, the two are easily confused.

In captivity, adults are fed a diet of bananas, mangoes, melons, and other soft fruits.

Distribution
This species can be found in Democratic Republic of the Congo, Malawi, Mozambique, South Africa and Tanzania.

References

MacLeay W.S. (1838) On the Cetoniidae of South Africa. Smith A. Illustrations of the zoology of South Africa; consisting chiefly of figures and descriptions of the objects of natural history collected during an expedition into the interior of South Africa, in the years 1834, Smith, Elder & Co. London 3:3-52
Scarabs: World Scarabaeidae Database. Schoolmeesters P.

External links
 Natural World
 Meloida

Cetoniinae
Beetles described in 1838